Paturi Rajagopala Naidu, better known as Rajanna (5 April 1920 – 21 October 1996), was an Indian freedom fighter, parliamentarian, and kisan (farmer) leader. He was the political guru of Nara Chandrababu Naidu. He was an exponent of the peasant philosophy, and considered the father of the Indian Peasant Movement after Swami Sahajanand Saraswati.

Early life

Rajagopala Naidu was born on 5 April 1920 at Diguvamagham to Smt. Paturi Lakshmamma and Shri. Paturi Srinivasulu Naidu. His primary education was at Diguvamagham Aided School, Secondary Education at District Board High School, Chittoor and his higher education was at Government College, Anantapur and was completed in 1942.

Shri. Chennakrishnayya and Shri. K. Rama Naidu were his teachers at Diguvamagham. He stayed along with Shri. Bollineni Parthasarathy Naidu's family during his schooling days at Chittoor and at Shri. Konda Venkatappaiah's family in Anantapur.

He had inclination towards politics from his college days and was inspired by a communist leader Shri. Tadipatri Rami Reddy. He discretely disseminated "Akashavani" newspaper riding a bicycle and used to go to college wearing "Gandhian Cap" and started numerous daring developments against British principle by dislodging the railway tracks.

He returned to Diguvamagham holding a bachelor's degree in 1942 and engaged in social service in and around Diguvamagham village by starting many social organizations.

He has played a stage performance “ Annagari Koolodu” for which Shri. N.G.Ranga was the chief guest. From then on he was greatly inspired by Shri. N.G. Ranga and later become his follower and close associate.

He was married to Smt. Amaravathamma, daughter of Shri. Seenaiah Naidu, of Kondrajukalva village. After marriage, he started his career as a teacher at Sholingur and later at Uttara Brahmana Palli, Elementary School, Diguvamagham. After that, he worked at Oriental publishing company, Madras for few days and also at their Chittoor branch.

His daughter, Aruna Kumari was born in 1945. His wife, Smt. Paturi Amaravathamma died in 1947 and thereafter he remained a widower.

Political career

Children
Rajagopala Naidu has one daughter, Galla Aruna Kumari.

Family
 Dr. Ramachandra Naidu Galla- Son-in-law
 Dr. Ramadevi Gourineni- Granddaughter married to Dr. Prasad Gourineni
Jayadev Galla - Grandson married to Padma Galla
 Harshavardhana Gourineni, Vikramaditya Gourineni married to Ankita - Great grandchildren
 Ashok Galla, Siddharth Galla - Great grandchildren

Other Major Inspiring Activities

While he was alive there were no instances of any political, education, or cultural event being organised without his participation.

Shri. Rajagopala Naidu, strongly believed that a society's development greatly depends on the education of the people in that society. With the inspiration and his motivation, Smt. Aruna Kumari Galla and Dr. Ramachandra Naidu Galla, established a non-profit charitable association in 1969, Krishnadevaraya Educational and Cultural Association (KECA), to help deserving meritorious students. 
KECA till today has supported 1500 students with financial support of close to Rs. 2.25 crores.

Author and Philosopher

He was an author, philosopher, novel playwright and has written: Sarasisa, Bagna Hruydayam, Porabatu, Ranaprathap, kalasajalalu, Tyaga Bhoomi, Bharatha Vijayam, Vennela velugulu, Chandragiri Durgam, Chatrapathi Sivaji, Daivopahatudu, Dara, Jejavva, Ramanujuni Prathigna, Gandikota, Matrumandiram, Madhulika, Tamasoma, Kurukshetre, Radeyudu, Bagyanagaram, Krishnavataram, Bhagavan Parasuram, Pridvivallabudu, Buddamsaranamgachhami, Netaji, translation of few Malayalaswamy writings.
He has also written Mahabharath in English: “The Trial The Triumph”.

References

1920 births
1997 deaths
India MPs 1977–1979
India MPs 1980–1984
Lok Sabha members from Andhra Pradesh
Swatantra Party politicians
Telugu politicians
People from Rayalaseema
People from Chittoor district